Inženýrská odysea ("engineer's odyssey") is a Czechoslovak/Czech TV series about three young students and their lives.

Plot
The story begins in college, where three young students, Zbyněk, Vašek, and Jano, are roommates. They decide to work for the same company after their studies, but after military service, they each go to a different city.

External links
 Inženýrská odysea at CSFD
 

Czech drama television series
Czechoslovak television series
1979 Czechoslovak television series debuts
2006 Czech television series endings
1970s Czechoslovak television series
1980s Czechoslovak television series
2000s Czech television series
1990s Czech television series
Czech Television original programming